Keita Asama (born August 19, 1984) is a former Japanese baseball player.  He played in the Pacific League for the Chiba Lotte Marines.

References

External links
 

Living people
1984 births
People from Chiba (city)
Japanese baseball players
Chiba Lotte Marines players
21st-century Japanese people